Pattillo is a surname. Notable people with the surname include:

Alan Pattillo (1929–2020), British writer and director 
Bob Pattillo, American entrepreneur 
Charles C. Pattillo (1924–2019), American Air Force lieutenant general 
Cuthbert A. Pattillo (1924–2014), United States Air Force Major General
Greg Pattillo (born 1977), American beatboxing flautist
Johnny Pattillo (1914–2002), Scottish football player and manager
Marcus Pattillo (born 1977), American former Major League Baseball umpire
Mary Pattillo, American sociologist and African-American Studies scholar
Roland Pattillo, African-American medical doctor and researcher

See also
Meanings of minor planet names: 58001–59000#535